Camp Eggers was a United States military base in Kabul, Afghanistan located near the US Embassy and the Afghan Presidential Palace. The camp was named after Captain Daniel W. Eggers, a US soldier from the 1st Battalion, 3rd Special Forces Group (Airborne), Fort Bragg, North Carolina, who was killed by an improvised explosive device (IED) along with three other soldiers on 29 May 2004 near Kandahar. Camp Eggers closed in 2015 as a part of the partial withdrawal of U.S. troops from Afghanistan (2011–2016).

Overview 
Camp Eggers was home to the Combined Forces Command - Afghanistan (CFC-A) and the Combined Security Transition Command - Afghanistan (CSTC-A). It was used by all U.S. military branches and the International Security Assistance Force (ISAF).

Noted personnel 

 Lt. Gen David Barno, first Commander of Combined Forces Command-Afghanistan

References

External links

Camp Eggers from Globalsecurity.org

Black sites
Military installations of the United States in Afghanistan
Military bases of Australia in Afghanistan
Military installations of New Zealand
Military installations of France in other countries
Military installations of Turkey
2014 disestablishments in Afghanistan
Military installations closed in 2014